Clepsis kearfotti is a species of moth of the family Tortricidae. It is found in North America, where it has been recorded from Alaska and Alberta.

Etymology
The species is named in honour of William Dunham Kearfott.

References

Moths described in 1962
Clepsis